Baker is an unincorporated community in northeastern Texas County, Oklahoma, United States, ¼ mile north of U.S. Route 64. Tyrone lies six miles to the north-northwest on U.S. Route 54 and Turpin lies eight miles to the east at the intersection of Route 64 and U.S. Route 83 in adjacent Beaver County.

Founded between Hooker and Turpin Oklahoma, a child of the BM&E (Beaver. Meade and Englewood, Later MKT) railroad. Baker become a double railroad town in its infancy when the CRI&P (Chicago Rock Island and Pacific) crossed through just three years after being platted. Named after a Hooker, Oklahoma man, Reuben F. Baker whom sold the acreage for the town from his quarter section where baker lies, the town sprung to existence in the summer and fall of 1926. The town thrived in its early years and persevered through the dust bowl and Great Depression. Home to the remnants of the Eureka school (Eureka Polar Bears), Baker has but few residents left. However, two grain elevators still operate today, centered in wheat and corn country. One elevator, the Riffe-Gilmore elevator is one of few Riffe-Gilmore elevators still in operation, having been operated by the same family since its inception on the railroad in 1926. GW Riffe, an early settler of the area was one of the first to plant wheat in the new Oklahoma territory near Baker as what was once known as “no man’s land” became the Oklahoma Panhandle. The town briefly held the name of Bakerburg after opening a post office in 1931, as another Baker, Oklahoma held a post office in that name, after that town's post office closed, Bakerburg was once again Baker, officially renaming in 1953. The last Katy train left eastbound from Baker around January 4, 1973. Following bankruptcy of the Chicago Rock Island line in 1974, the last trains of the thriving Baker town left the transportation of the surrounding wheat fields to trucks on US Highway 64.

Demographics

NRHP Sites

Both the Baker Woodframe Elevator and the separate Baker Woodframe Grain Elevator are NRHP-listed.

References

Unincorporated communities in Texas County, Oklahoma
Unincorporated communities in Oklahoma
Oklahoma Panhandle